Maria Magdalena Garro (born 18 February 1989) is an Argentine Olympic canoeist. She represented her country at the 2016 Summer Olympics.

References 

1989 births
Living people
Argentine female canoeists
Canoeists at the 2016 Summer Olympics
Olympic canoeists of Argentina
Pan American Games medalists in canoeing
Pan American Games silver medalists for Argentina
Pan American Games bronze medalists for Argentina
Canoeists at the 2015 Pan American Games
Canoeists at the 2019 Pan American Games
Medalists at the 2015 Pan American Games
Medalists at the 2019 Pan American Games
21st-century Argentine women